The 1994 Winter Olympics torch relay was run from November 27, 1993 until February 12, 1994 prior to the 1994 Winter Olympics in Lillehammer. Prince Haakon lit the cauldron at the opening ceremony. It is the sixth Winter torch relay (after 1972, 1976, 1980 and 1984) to have more than one route. On January 16, 1994, it traveled to the Arctic Circle.

Route in Greece

Route in Europe

Route in Norway

References

External links
Info about the 1994 torch relay on the IOC website

Torch Relay, 1994 Winter Olympics
Olympic torch relays